Abralia renschi is a species of enoploteuthid cephalopod found in the waters of Sumatra, Java and the Maldives. It may be a subspecies of A. steindachneri.

References

Abralia
Taxa named by Georg Grimpe
Molluscs described in 1931